The Aussie Property Flippers is an Australian lifestyle/home renovating television series on the Seven Network. The series was commissioned in October 2016 and began airing on 26 April 2017. The series follows a number of people "flipping" properties which involves buying, renovating and selling property to make a quick profit.

Episodes

See also
 Changing Rooms
 Room for Improvement
 The Block
 House Rules

Notes
Melbourne, Adelaide & Perth only
Sydney & Brisbane only

References

Seven Network original programming
Australian non-fiction television series
2017 Australian television series debuts
2017 Australian television series endings